The Sun in a Net Awards are annual awards that recognize accomplishments in filmmaking and television. It is the highest award of achievement in film awarded in Slovakia. It is organised by the Slovak Film and Television Academy. Awards were originally held bi-annually.

The awards were established in 2004. The award is named after the 1963 Slovak-language film The Sun in a Net. The first awards were held in 2006.

Categories
 Best Film
 Best Documentary
 Best Animated Film
 Best Director
 Best Screenplay
 Best Cinematography
 Best Editing
 Best Sound
 Best Scenography
 Best Music
 Best Costumes
 Best Masks
 Best Actor in Leading Role
 Best Actress in Leading Role
 Best Supporting Actor
 Best Supporting Actress

Best film winners

References

 
Slovak film awards
Awards established in 2004